Juan Carlos Gómez (9 May 1932 – 22 March 2021) was an Argentine rower. He competed at the 1964 Summer Olympics and the 1968 Summer Olympics.

References

External links
 

1932 births
2021 deaths
Argentine male rowers
Olympic rowers of Argentina
Rowers at the 1964 Summer Olympics
Rowers at the 1968 Summer Olympics
Sportspeople from Rosario, Santa Fe
Pan American Games medalists in rowing
Pan American Games gold medalists for Argentina
Pan American Games silver medalists for Argentina
Rowers at the 1951 Pan American Games
Rowers at the 1955 Pan American Games
Rowers at the 1967 Pan American Games
Medalists at the 1951 Pan American Games
Medalists at the 1955 Pan American Games
20th-century Argentine people
21st-century Argentine people